Sérgio Luiz Seixas Francia Nogueira (born ) is a Brazilian male volleyball player. With his club Sada Cruzeiro he competed at the 2012 FIVB Volleyball Men's Club World Championship.

Sporting achievements

Clubs
 2000/2001  Brazilian Superliga, with Minas Tênis Clube
 2001/2002  Brazilian Superliga, with Minas Tênis Clube
 2006/2007  Brazilian Superliga, with Minas Tênis Clube
 2011/2012  Brazilian Superliga, with Sada Cruzeiro
 2013/2014  Brazilian Superliga, with Sada Cruzeiro
 2014/2015  Brazilian Superliga, with Sada Cruzeiro
 2015/2016  Brazilian Superliga, with Sada Cruzeiro
 2016/2017  Brazilian Superliga, with Sada Cruzeiro
 2017/2018  Brazilian Superliga, with Sada Cruzeiro

South American Club Championship
  1999 – with Minas Tênis Clube
  2012 – with Sada Cruzeiro
  2014 – with Sada Cruzeiro
  2015 – with Sada Cruzeiro
  2016 – with Sada Cruzeiro
  2017 – with Sada Cruzeiro
  2018 – with Sada Cruzeiro
  2019 – with Sada Cruzeiro

FIVB Club World Championship

  2012 – with Sada Cruzeiro
  2013 – with Sada Cruzeiro
  2015 – with Sada Cruzeiro
  2016 – with Sada Cruzeiro
  2017 – with Sada Cruzeiro

Individually
 2012 Brazilian Superliga - Best Receiver
 2012 South American Club Championship – Best Libero
 2012 FIVB Club World Championship - Best Receiver
 2012 FIVB Club World Championship - Best Libero
 2013 Brazilian Superliga - Best Digger
 2013 FIVB Club World Championship - Best Libero
 2015 Brazilian Superliga - Best Digger
 2015 FIVB Club World Championship - Best Libero
 2015 South American Club Championship – Best Libero
 2016 Brazilian Superliga - Best Digger
 2016 FIVB Club World Championship - Best Libero
 2017 Brazilian Superliga - Best Digger
 2018 South American Club Championship – Best Libero

References

External links
 profile at FIVB.org

1978 births
Living people
Brazilian men's volleyball players
Place of birth missing (living people)
Sportspeople from Belo Horizonte